Kaladevanhalli Ramprasad (17 December 1933 – 23 November 2015) was an Indian cricketer. He played four first-class matches for Mysore between 1959 and 1962.

See also
 List of Karnataka cricketers

References

External links
 

1933 births
2015 deaths
Indian cricketers
Karnataka cricketers
Cricketers from Mysore